James Edward Dauris (born 1966) is a British diplomat who previously served as the ambassador of the United Kingdom to Peru and as the High Commissioner of the UK to Sri Lanka and the Maldives.

Career 

Dauris was schooled at Haileybury. He graduated from the University of Cambridge with a degree in Law After university he trained to be a Solicitor and worked for Ashurst Morris Crisp from 1991.

Dauris changed careers and joined the Foreign and Commonwealth Office in 1995.  For his first overseas posting he was First Secretary (Commercial) at the British Embassy in Moscow.  He served as a Deputy Head of Mission in Colombia from 2005 to 2009. He then served as Ambassador to Peru between 2010 and 2014. In April 2015, he was appointed as the new High Commissioner to Sri Lanka until August 2019 and Sarah Hulton was formally appointed during April 2019, prior to the 2019 Easter Sunday bombings, replacing him from August 2019.

Criticisms 

During the 2018 Sri Lankan constitutional crisis, the Professionals' National Front (PNF), a minority political party requested him to stay away from involving in internal affairs of the state unnecessarily.

Personal life 

He is married to Helen Dauris and the couple have three daughters.

References 

1966 births
Living people
Ambassadors of the United Kingdom to Peru
High Commissioners of the United Kingdom to Sri Lanka
High Commissioners of the United Kingdom to the Maldives
Alumni of the University of Cambridge
Alumni of Downing College, Cambridge
People educated at Haileybury and Imperial Service College